Steps to Christ is a book written by Ellen G. White, pioneer and prophetess of the Seventh-day Adventist Church. It was first published in 1892 by Fleming H. Revell Company. The copyright was purchased by Seventh-day Adventist publisher Review and Herald Publishing Association in 1892, and was first printed there in 1896. A new first chapter, "God's Love for Man" was added per request of the Seventh-day Adventist publishing house in the United Kingdom (Stanborough Press) in 1893 in order to secure a copyright. This is perhaps the most popular and widely read book by the author, printed in more than 150 languages worldwide. Steps to Christ is considered to define what Seventh-day Adventists believe in subjects such as salvation, the nature of man, and what a Christian’s life should be.

Steps to Christ discusses how to come to know Jesus Christ at a personal level.  It covers the topics of repentance, confession, faith, acceptance, growing into Christ, and prayer.

Publication
Steps to Christ has been widely published by the Review and Herald Publishing Association and Pacific Press in multiple printings and by other publishers under public domain.  Various titles have been distributed over the years with different cover illustrations. Other known titles include Happiness Digest, The Road to Redemption, The Path to Peace, and Finding Peace.

Versions containing inset boxes with additional inserted comments have been published for youth.

Translations

Existing Translations 
As has been stated, this book has been printed in more than 150 languages worldwide.

See also

 The Desire of Ages
 Conflict of the Ages
 Teachings of Ellen White
 Inspiration of Ellen White
 List of Ellen White writings

References

External links 

 Steps to Christ online at the official Ellen G. White Estate website
 1892 Steps to Christ

American non-fiction books
Books by Ellen G. White
1892 non-fiction books
Seventh-day Adventist theology
Seventh-day Adventist media